Events in the year 1997 in Mexico.

Incumbents

Federal government
 President: Ernesto Zedillo
 Interior Secretary (SEGOB): Emilio Chuayffet.
 Secretary of Foreign Affairs (SRE): José Ángel Gurría
 Communications Secretary (SCT): Carlos Ruiz Sacristán
 Secretary of Defense (SEDENA): Enrique Cervantes Aguirre
 Secretary of Navy: José Ramón Lorenzo Franco
 Secretary of Labor and Social Welfare: José Antonio González Fernández
 Secretary of Welfare: Carlos Rojas Gutiérrez
 Secretary of Public Education: Miguel Limón Rojas
 Tourism Secretary (SECTUR): Óscar Espinosa Villarreal
 Secretary of the Environment (SEMARNAT): Julia Carabias Lillo
 Secretary of Health (SALUD): Juan Ramón de la Fuente

Supreme Court

 President of the Supreme Court: José Vicente Aguinaco Alemán

Governors

Head of Government of the Federal District
Oscar Espinosa Villarreal (PRI) (until December 4)
Cuauhtémoc Cárdenas (PRD) (starting December 5) First elected leader of Mexico City.
Aguascalientes: Otto Granados Roldán, (PRI)
Baja California: Héctor Terán Terán, (PAN).
Baja California Sur: Guillermo Mercado Romero/Leonel Cota Montaño
Campeche: Jorge Salomón Azar García/José Antonio González Curi 
Chiapas: Julio César Ruíz Ferro/Roberto Albores Guillén 
Chihuahua: Francisco Barrio (PAN)
Coahuila: Rogelio Montemayor Seguy (PAN)
Colima: Carlos de la Madrid Virgen/Fernando Moreno Peña (PAN)
Durango: Ángel Sergio Guerrero Mier (PAN)
Guanajuato: Vicente Fox Quesada (PAN),
Guerrero: Ángel Aguirre Rivero
Hidalgo: Jesús Murillo Karam
Jalisco: Alberto Cárdenas Jiménez
State of Mexico: César Camacho Quiroz
Michoacán: Víctor Manuel Tinoco
Morelos: Jorge Carrillo Olea (PRI).
Nayarit: Rigoberto Ochoa Zaragoza
Nuevo León: Benjamín Clariond/Fernando Canales
Oaxaca: Diódoro Carrasco Altamirano
Puebla: Manuel Bartlett Díaz
Querétaro: Enrique Burgos García/Ignacio Loyola Vera 
Quintana Roo: Mario Villanueva Madrid
San Luis Potosí: Horacio Sánchez Unzueta/Fernando Silva Nieto
Sinaloa: Renato Vega Alvarado
Sonora: Manlio Fabio Beltrones Rivera/Armando López Nogales
Tabasco: Roberto Madrazo Pintado
Tamaulipas:	Manuel Cavazos Lerma
Tlaxcala: José Antonio Álvarez Lima
Veracruz: Patricio Chirinos Calero
Yucatán: Víctor Cervera Pacheco
Zacatecas: Arturo Romo Gutiérrez

Events

 Convergence was founded as a "national political grouping". 
 March 13: Phoenix Lights in Sonora.
 June 6: 1997 Mexican legislative election 
 September: Nuestra Belleza México 1997 
 December 22: Acteal Massacre

Awards
Belisario Domínguez Medal of Honor – Heberto Castillo

Hurricanes

 June 1–7: Tropical Storm Andres (1997)
 September 16–26: Hurricane Nora (1997) 
 September 26 – October 12: Tropical Storm Olaf (1997) 
 October 5–10: Hurricane Pauline

Sport

 1996–97 Mexican Primera División season
 1996–97 Copa Mexico 
 Petroleros de Poza Rica win the Mexican League.
 Homenaje a Salvador Lutteroth (1997) 
 Atlético Mexiquense and Chivas Tijuana are founded. 
 The Chupacabras race is held for the first time.

Births
 October 29 – Ale Müller, actress and singer

Deaths
 
October 24 – Luis Aguilar, actor and singer (b. 1918)

References

External links

 
Years of the 20th century in Mexico
Mexico
1990s in Mexico
Mexico